Saxons F.C. was an English association football club from Brixton.  Its colours were a dark blue jersey with a red band on each arm, white knickerbockers, and dark blue stockings.  The club was a small one, with a membership of 25 in 1876.

History

The club's first recorded game was a 2-1 home win against Gresham F.C. in January 1875, and its last recorded game a 4-0 home defeat to the Ramblers in February 1877, despite only nine of the visiting players turning up.

The club's ground, near the Loughborough Road in Brixton, was notorious for its muddy conditions.

The club only played in the FA Cup once, losing 4-1 at South Norwood in 1876-77.  The match was an acrimonious one.  The Saxons were said to be playing "on the win tie or wrangle principal [sic]", and were "apparently intent upon displaying their powers of polite repartee to make up for their deficiency in the knowledge of the Association rules."  The approach did bring the Saxons the benefit of a goal which, according to the spectators, struck the tape and went over, but after the Saxons players "were prepared to take their affidavits that it went under", W.H. White, the South Norwood captain, conceded the goal.  It availed the club nothing as South Norwood were already four goals to the good. Frank Haslam, the Saxons' captain, complained that South Norwood kept interrupting the game by claiming offside, and blaming White for "a temper and disposition which totally unfits him for the football field"; however the South Norwood secretary C.E. Leeds complained in turn about the Saxons players regularly disputing refereeing decisions, often in unison, and dismissed the club as "comparatively obscure".

For the 1877-78 season, many of the Saxons players (including Haslam) joined the new Grey Friars club and the Saxons club was dissolved.

Separate Sheffield club

They are not to be confused with Saxons FC of Sheffield, formed in 1877 and who were dissolved in around 1880, who played at Norfolk Park, and whose colours were navy blue with a Union Jack on the chest.

References

Defunct football clubs in England
Defunct football clubs in London
Association football clubs disestablished in 1877
Association football clubs established in 1874
1874 establishments in England
1877 disestablishments in England